Diclis is a genus of flowering plants belonging to the family Scrophulariaceae.

Its native range is Tropical Africa, Western Indian Ocean.

Species:

Diclis bambuseti 
Diclis ovata 
Diclis petiolaris 
Diclis reptans 
Diclis rotundifolia 
Diclis sessilifolia 
Diclis stellarioides 
Diclis tenella 
Diclis tenuissima

References

Scrophulariaceae
Scrophulariaceae genera